The Innocents is the second studio album by American musician Weyes Blood. The album was released on October 21, 2014, by Mexican Summer.

Track listing

References

2014 albums
Weyes Blood albums